Roger Colliot (2 September 1925 – 27 July 2004) was a French football defender who was a member of the French squad at the 1952 Summer Olympics.

References

External links
 
Profile

1925 births
2004 deaths
French footballers
Association football defenders
Olympic footballers of France
Footballers at the 1952 Summer Olympics
CO Roubaix-Tourcoing players